Burns Cottage, the first home of Robert Burns is located in Alloway, South Ayrshire, Scotland. It was built by his father, William Burness in 1757. Burns, Scotland's national poet, was born there on 25 January 1759. It is a two-roomed clay and thatch cottage and has been fully restored to become part of Robert Burns Birthplace Museum.

The museum has a bust of Burns by Patric Park.

History
The cottage has had a number of uses, including a spell as a pub, run by a Mr Goudie from Riccarton who saw the opportunity to exploit Burns's developing reputation. 
At first therefore the cottage was not greatly valued. The Suffragettes recognised its importance, having once endeavoured to set the cottage alight.

In 1818, the English poet John Keats took a trip to Scotland to visit the home, years after Burns' death in 1796. Before Keats arrived, he wrote to a friend that "one of the pleasantest means of annulling self is approaching such a shrine as the cottage of Burns — we need not think of his misery — that is all gone — bad luck to it — I shall look upon it all with unmixed pleasure." but his encounter with the cottage's alcoholic custodian returned him to thoughts of misery.

Pictures

See also
Burns Cottage (Atlanta), a reproduction of Burns' birthplace, built in 1911

References

External links 
 Robert Burns Birthplace Museum
 Pictures of Burns Cottage, Alloway

 
B
Literary museums in Scotland
Biographical museums in Scotland
Burns, Robert
Buildings and structures in Ayr
Cottages